Get Up Offa That Thing is the 43rd studio album by American musician James Brown. The album was released in July 1976, by Polydor Records.

Track listing
All tracks composed by Deanna Brown, Deirdre Brown and Yamma Brown; except where indicated.

Personnel
James Brown - lead vocals, arrangements
Patricia Dryden - cover illustration

References

1976 albums
James Brown albums
Albums produced by James Brown
Polydor Records albums